The Banner 37 is a Canadian sailboat that was designed by Stan Huntingford as a cruiser and first built in 1982.

Production
The design was built by Cooper Enterprises in Port Coquitlam, British Columbia, starting in 1982, but the company went out of business in 1990 and it is now out of production.

Design
The Banner 37 is a recreational keelboat, built predominantly of fibreglass, with wood trim. It has a masthead sloop rig, a raked stem and a fixed fin keel. It displaces  and carries  of ballast.

The boat is fitted with a Swedish Volvo MD17D diesel engine for docking and manoeuvring.

See also
List of sailing boat types

References

External links
Photo of a Banner 37

Keelboats
1980s sailboat type designs
Sailing yachts 
Sailboat type designs by Stan Huntingford
Sailboat types built by Cooper Enterprises